Thomas Nunneley  (1809 - 1 June 1870), was a British surgeon who at first focussed on eye and ear surgery, and built a large private practice in this field. He wrote several essays and books including on topics of erysipelas, eye surgery and on the effects of anaesthesia and hydrocyanic acid.

After studying in Paris he settled in Leeds, where he became attached to the Eye and Ear Infirmary and the Leeds School of Medicine, where he taught surgery and anatomy. In 1864 he became surgeon to the Leeds Infirmary. He opposed Joseph Lister's antisepsis and did not believe in the germ-theory of wound infections. He served as a witness in civil and criminal cases, including being first witness in the trial of William Palmer.

Early life and family
Thomas Nunneley was born in 1809, in Market Harborough.

Career
Nunneley became apprentice to a surgeon at Wellingborough and gained surgical experience at Guy's Hospital where he served as dresser to a Mr Keys. In 1832 he gained a licenciate of the Apothecaries. After studying in Paris he settled in Leeds, where he became attached to the Eye and Ear Infirmary and the Leeds School of Medicine, where he taught surgery and anatomy.

Early in his surgical career he focussed on eye and ear surgery, and built a large private practice in this field. His first essay on erysipelas was published in 1831 and won the prize from the Junior Physiological Society of Guy's but was rejected for the Fothergillian medal in 1841. He published The Organs of Vision, their Anatomy and Physiology in 1858. Other works included the essay "The Effects produced by Hydrocyanic Acid on Animal Life; with an attempt to determine the real value of presumed antidotes and remedies" and "On Anaesthesia and other Anaesthetic Substances; being an experimental inquiryinto their nature, properties, and actions, and their comparative value and danger, and the best means of counteracting an overdose". He published his last essay "On the Effect of the Calabar Bean on the Animal Economy" in 1863. His papers "On Aneurism of the Eyeball" and "Vascular Protrusion of the Eyeball" appeared in the Medico-Chirurgical transactions.

In 1864 he became surgeon to the Leeds Infirmary. He regularly contributed to the British Medical Journal and wrote several texts. He was one of the first to perform the operation of excising the tongue. In 1869 at the meeting of the British Medical Association in Leeds, he made clear his opposition to Joseph Lister's antisepsis and disbelief in the germ-theory of wound infections.

In 1843, he became one of the original 300 Fellows of the Royal College of Surgeons.

Trial of William Palmer

He served as a witness in civil and criminal cases. He was the first witness in the trial of William Palmer, He presented his opinion on the eighth day of the trial, concluding that "I am of the opinion that death was caused by some convulsive disease".

Death
Nunneley died on 1 June 1870, at the age of 62.

Selected publications

Articles

Books

References

Further reading

External links 

1809 births
1870 deaths
British surgeons
19th-century English medical doctors
Physicians of Guy's Hospital
Fellows of the Royal College of Surgeons